Tityassus or Tityassos was a town of ancient Isauria and of Pisidia, inhabited in Hellenistic and Roman times. It became a bishopric; no longer the seat of a residential bishop, it remains a titular see of the Roman Catholic Church.

Its site is located near Yenişarbademli (Bademli), Asiatic Turkey.

References

Populated places in ancient Isauria
Populated places in Pisidia
Former populated places in Turkey
Roman towns and cities in Turkey
History of Isparta Province
Catholic titular sees in Asia
Yenişarbademli District